Scibe Airlift was an airline from Zaire (today known as Democratic Republic of the Congo), with its base at N'Djili Airport, Kinshasa.

History
The airline started activities in November 1976 as SBZ Cargo with a single Vickers Viscount. Due to problems concerning the national airline, Air Zaire, Scibe Airlift became the first passenger airline in the country. After covering the whole country, it bought a Boeing 707, which allowed for serving Europe.  In the early 1990s Scibe Airlift was at its height, serving a multitude of destinations and leasing its aircraft out to European airlines. In 1992, it operated a DC-10-30 on its Kinshasa-Brussels route.

The political instability of the country and the poor financial management of the company brought it to an end. Scibe Airlift ceased its operations on 29 September 1998 when its last aircraft was stored at London Southend Airport.

Accidents and incidents 
On 13 December 1992 a Fokker F-27-400M operated by Scibe Airlift Cargo crashed with 37 fatalities about 10 km (6.3 mls) from Goma
On 18 January 1994 a Learjet 24D operated by Scibe Airlift Cargo ran out of fuel and crashed on approach on  a repositioning flight from Cotonou Airport (COO/DBBB), Benin to Kinshasa-N'djili Airport (FIH/FZAA) killing two crew.
The 1996 Air Africa crash killed an estimated 297, mostly on the ground.  It was a lease from Scibe.

Historical fleet 
Beechcraft Super King Air 200 
Boeing 707-320 and 707-320C 
Boeing 727-100 and 727-100C
Canadair CL-601-3A 
de Havilland Canada DHC-6-300
Fokker 27-400M and Fokker 27-500 
Learjet 24D
Lockheed L-100-30 
McDonnell Douglas DC-10-10 and DC-10-30
Pilatus PC-6/B Turbo Porter
Vickers Viscount 757 and 880C

Further reading
J Rupert, "Zaïre reportedly selling arms to Angolan ex-rebels", The Washington Post, 21 March 1997.
"Chaos am Himmel ueber Afrika", Die Zeit, May 1996.

See also		
 Transport in the Democratic Republic of the Congo

References

External links

Defunct airlines of the Democratic Republic of the Congo
Companies based in Kinshasa
Airlines established in 1976
Airlines disestablished in 1998
1976 establishments in Zaire